The 2003 Lexmark Indy 300 was the eighteenth last race of the 2003 CART World Series season, held on 26 October 2003 on the Surfers Paradise Street Circuit, Queensland, Australia.  A hail storm 20 minutes into the race caused an hour long red flag period and shortened the race to 47 laps from the scheduled 65.

Ryan Hunter-Reay won the race, his first victory in top-level American open wheel racing, and Reynard's final win in CART competition (sweeping the podium positions). Neither of the two drivers who could still win the season championship, leader Paul Tracy and second-place Bruno Junqueira, finished in the Top 12 points-paying positions (though Junqueira received two bonus points on the weekend: one for having the fastest lap in Friday qualifying, and the other for leading the most laps in the race), meaning Tracy had a big enough lead to clinch the championship with one race to go.

Final CART event
The event was to have been the penultimate race of the 2003 season, but it later became the final round after the 2003 King Taco 500 was canceled because of a wildfire near to the California Speedway venue.  In December 2003 the CART World Series declared bankruptcy and as a result went out of business. Therefore, this race became the final completed CART sanctioned event, although the series would be reborn under new ownership as the Champ Car World Series in 2004.

Qualifying results

Race

Caution flags

Notes

 New Race Record Ryan Hunter-Reay 1:49:02.803
 Average Speed 72.280 mph

References

External links
 Full Weekend Times & Results

Lexmark Indy 300
Lexmark Indy 300
Gold Coast Indy 300